Perets may refer to:

Perez (son of Judah), a Biblical caharacter
Perets (surname)
Spelling variant of the name Peretz
Perets', Ukrainian satirical illustrated magazine